David Coffin is an American folk musician specializing in early music and sea music, based in Gloucester, Massachusetts, United States. He is the song leader for the Revels music programs in Cambridge, Massachusetts. He also presents music enrichment programs for schools throughout New England. One program is based on the history of the recorder, and the other is called Life at Sea: A Voyage in Song.

Coffin has a bass-baritone voice and plays various types of recorders and whistles, in addition to archaic instruments like the shawm, rackett, or gemshorn. He comes from a musical background: his father, Reverend William Sloane Coffin, studied to be a concert pianist with Nadia Boulanger in Paris, his grandfather was pianist Arthur Rubinstein, and his great-grandfather was Polish conductor Emil Młynarski.

Discography 
In addition to contributing to a variety of collaborative CDs for Revels Records and North Star Records (both are local New England recording labels), Coffin has also recorded four solo albums: Flight of Time, Nantucket Sleighride, Safe in the Harbour, and Last Trip Home which he recorded with his daughter Linnea. All feature traditional and maritime music, some of which is taken from the singing of Ewan MacColl and Stan Rogers.

References

External links 
 Official website of David Coffin
 The official website of Revels, Inc.
 
 
 

Year of birth missing (living people)
Living people
American folk musicians
American male singers
American bass-baritones
American woodwind musicians
American recorder players
Sarah Lawrence College alumni